The 1989 Czechoslovak presidential election was held on 29 December. Václav Havel became the first non-communist president of Czechoslovakia since 1948. Election was held following the Velvet Revolution.

Candidates
 Ladislav Adamec (KSČ)
 Čestmír Císař (SSM)
 Václav Havel (OF/VPN)

Havel was eventually the only candidate to participate in the election.

Other possible candidates
 Alexander Dubček was speculated to be a candidate. Dubček himself sought the nomination of VPN.

Opinion polls

Results
Havel received votes of all 183 members of House of the People and 140 members of House of Nations.

References

Presidential
1989
Velvet Revolution